Edward Elder Cooper was a prominent early black publisher in the United States. He was born into slavery in Duval County, Florida on 10. June 1859, and died at the age of 49 on 9 July 1908.

Cooper was the publisher of the Indianapolis Freeman, starting in July 1888, then sold it in 1892.

Cooper then launched The Colored American in Washington, D.C. starting in 1893. Cooper allied the newspaper with Booker T. Washington, Mary Church Terrell, and generally with the Republican Party. The newspaper fell into debt and shut down in 1904.

References 

African-American press
19th-century American slaves

Year of death missing
Place of birth missing
People from Duval County, Florida